Colias aurorina, the Greek clouded butterfly or dawn clouded yellow, is a butterfly in the family Pieridae. It is found in Central Greece, the Near East and the Caucasus area. It is rare in former Yugoslavia.

Description
Colias aurorina is one of the largest species of the genus; the wingspan is 35–70 mm. The upperside of the male is dusky
orange -yellow, with moderately broad blackish brown marginal band which is traversed at the apex by yellow veins, the rather large middle spot of the forewing being blackish brown and that of the hindwing large and orange-red. The ground-colour of the female is somewhat brighter red, the dark marginal band bearing large yellow spots, which on the hindwing form a proximally dark-edged band, the dark marginal band being obsolescent.

Biology
The butterfly flies from May to July.

The larvae feed on Astracantha and Astragalus species.

Subspecies
C. a. aurorina Armenia, Georgia, Azerbaijan, Talysh, N. Iran, Turkey
C. a. libanotica Lederer, 1858 Considered by some authors as a subspecies of Colias aurorina or as a distinct species. Israel, Lebanon, Turkey
C. l.(a.) heldreichi Staudinger, 1862 Greece 
C. l. (a.) sovarensis Blom, 1979 Iran
C. a. daghestanica Verhulst, 1994 Daghestan, Armenia
C. a. kermana Eckweiler, 1979 Iran (Kerman)
C. a. rosei Gross & Ebert, 1975 N.Iran (Elburs)
C. a. taurica Rebel, 1901 Turkey
C. a. transcaspica Christoph, 1889 Turkmenistan (Kopet-Dagh, W. Transcaspia)

References

External links
Colias aurorina Von J. Fuchs
 Butterflies of Europe
Butterfly Conservation Armenia

aurorina
Butterflies of Asia
Butterflies of Europe
Butterflies described in 1850